Aerenea subcostata is a species of beetle in the family Cerambycidae. It was described by Melzer in 1932. It is known from Brazil.

References

Compsosomatini
Beetles described in 1932